Congregational Church Of Austinburg (also known as The First United Church of Christ, Austinburg) is a historic congregational church on OH 307 in Austinburg, Ohio.

It was built in 1877 and added to the National Register of Historic Places in 1978. The congregation is currently affiliated with the United Church of Christ.

References

External links
Official Website

United Church of Christ churches in Ohio
Churches on the National Register of Historic Places in Ohio
Gothic Revival church buildings in Ohio
Churches completed in 1877
19th-century United Church of Christ church buildings
Buildings and structures in Ashtabula County, Ohio
National Register of Historic Places in Ashtabula County, Ohio
1877 establishments in Ohio